Tsukioka may refer to:

People:
Tsukioka Settei (1710–1787), Japanese ukiyo-e artist
Kōgyo Tsukioka (1869–1927), Japanese artist of the Meiji period
Yoshitoshi Tsukioka (1839–1892), Japanese artist
Yumeji Tsukioka (1922–2017), Japanese film actress

Railway stations:
Tsukioka Station (Niigata), railway station in the city of Shibata, Niigata, Japan
Tsukioka Station (Toyama), railway station on the Toyama Chihō Railway Kamidaki Line in the city of Toyama, Japan

See also
Tsuki
Tsuko (disambiguation)